Carl Bertelsmann (11 October 1791 – 17 December 1850) was a German businessman, publisher, and founder of German company Bertelsmann.

Life 
C. Bertelsmann Verlag was founded as a publishing house and print shop in July 1835 by Carl Bertelsmann. At first Bertelsmann concentrated on Christian songs and books. In 1851, led by Carl Bertelsmann's son Heinrich, the company began publishing novels.

His heirs, including grandson Reinhard Mohn (deceased), Reinhard's wife Elisabeth and their daughter Brigitte, continue to be in charge of the Bertelsmann group and the Bertelsmann Stiftung.

Literature

References

External links 
 Official website of the Bertelsmann group

German publishers (people)
German company founders
19th-century publishers (people)
19th-century German businesspeople
1791 births
1850 deaths
People from Gütersloh
Bertelsmann